Samina Quraeshi (1944-2013) was an award-winning educator, designer,
 
artist and author.

Life
She was raised in Karachi, Pakistan and lived in Massachusetts. 
She is the mother of Sadia Shepard, an author and filmmaker and Cassim Shepard a new York based town planner

Work
As an author she took inspiration from the Sufi tradition of the Indus Valley. She wrote the following books:
 Legacy of the Indus
 Lahore: the City Within
 Legends of the Indus
 Sacred Spaces: A Journey with the Sufis of the Indus (published by Peabody Museum Press in 2009)
 Reimagining West Coconut Grove: Landmarks

References

American women writers
Pakistani emigrants to the United States
American writers of Pakistani descent
Artists from Karachi
Writers from Karachi
1944 births
2013 deaths
21st-century American women